Paul Dunn is a Canadian playwright and actor. He is most noted as co-creator with Damien Atkins and Andrew Kushnir of The Gay Heritage Project, a theatrical show dramatizing aspects of LGBT history which was shortlisted for the Dora Mavor Moore Award for Outstanding New Play in 2014,

His other plays have included BOYS, Offensive Shadows, High-Gravel-Blind, Memorial, Outside, Dalton and Company and This Great City.

He is the partner of playwright and actor Mark Crawford.

References 

21st-century Canadian male actors
21st-century Canadian male writers
21st-century Canadian dramatists and playwrights
Canadian male stage actors
Canadian male dramatists and playwrights
Canadian LGBT dramatists and playwrights
Canadian gay actors
Canadian gay writers
Male actors from Ontario
Writers from Ontario
Living people
Year of birth missing (living people)
Gay dramatists and playwrights
21st-century Canadian LGBT people